The women's singles tournament of the 2017 BWF World Championships (World Badminton Championships) took place from 21 to 27 August.

Seeds
The seeding list is based on the World Rankings of Thursday 3 August 2017. The seeds are listed below:

  Akane Yamaguchi (third round)
  Sung Ji-hyun (third round)
  Carolina Marín (quarterfinals)
  P. V. Sindhu (final)
  Sun Yu (quarterfinals)
  He Bingjiao (third round)
  Nozomi Okuhara (champion)
  Ratchanok Intanon (quarterfinals)
  Chen Yufei (semifinals)
  Sayaka Sato (second round)
  Aya Ohori (third round)
  Saina Nehwal (semifinals)
  Cheung Ngan Yi (third round)
  Chen Xiaoxin (third round)
  Beatriz Corrales (third round)
  Kirsty Gilmour (quarterfinals)

Draw

Finals

Section 1

Section 2

Section 3

Section 4

References

External links
Draw

2017 BWF World Championships
BWF